This is a list of people executed in the United States in 2016. A total of twenty people, all male, were executed in the United States in 2016, all by lethal injection. The state of Georgia executed nine people, setting a record for the most executions conducted there in a calendar year.

List of people executed in the United States in 2016

Demographics

Executions in recent years

Record number of executions in Georgia
 

In 2016, the State of Georgia executed nine people. This set a record for the most executions conducted in Georgia in a calendar year. Prior to this, the most executions conducted in the state were five executions. This happened in 1987 and again in 2015.

Last meals

 Henry Hargreaves, a Brooklyn-based photographer, recreated (and then photographed) the last meals served to all twenty men executed in 2016. Through his series, entitled A Year of Killing, Hargreaves sought to educate people about the use of the death penalty. This work is a sequel to his 2011 series No Seconds, which recreated the last meals ordered by famous criminals like Ted Bundy.

 In 2016, the most-ordered food was steak, followed by pizza, although some of the condemned prisoners elected to forgo a special last meal.

See also
 List of death row inmates in the United States
 List of juveniles executed in the United States since 1976
 List of most recent executions by jurisdiction
 List of people executed in Georgia (U.S. state)
 List of women executed in the United States since 1976

References

List of people executed in the United States
Executions
People executed in the United States
2016
Male murderers